Marcus Claudius Marcellus was a Roman general who fought Hannibal's forces during the Second Punic War.

Marcus Claudius Marcellus may also refer to:

Marcus Claudius Marcellus (consul 331 BC)
Marcus Claudius Marcellus (consul 196 BC)
Marcus Claudius Marcellus (consul 183 BC)
Marcus Claudius Marcellus (consul 166 BC)
Marcus Claudius Marcellus (aedile 91 BC)
Marcus Claudius Marcellus (consul 51 BC), political opponent of Julius Caesar, assassinated circa 47 BC by one of his own attendants
Marcus Claudius Marcellus (nephew of Augustus)
Marcus Claudius Marcellus Aeserninus, any one of several members of this family, one of whom was consul in 22 BC

See also
 Claudii Marcelli